Rainbow sauce refers to several types of culinary sauces. The term also refers to a food presentation or preparation style in which several sauces are placed on a food dish or plate alongside one-another, and also a sauce preparation method in which several sauces are mixed together.

Rainbow sauces
Rainbow sauce is a dessert sauce prepared with pineapple, candied cherries, apricot, citron, pears, and pistachio nuts. The ingredients are chopped, combined and boiled in simple syrup to create a sauce. This sauce is typically served atop ice cream.

The term also refers to sweet and sour sauce that may utilize many types of ingredients that are combined and heated to create a sauce. Myriad ingredients in its preparation can include green pepper, canned fruit cocktail, corn starch, vinegar, pineapple, pickled and sweet ginger, pickled cucumber, carrot, maraschino cherries, sugar, brown sugar, Worcestershire sauce, soy sauce, lemon juice, cranberry juice, vinegar, and others. This type of sauce may be served on chicken dishes, among others.

Another version is a savory sauce prepared with ingredients such as cream, white wine, shallots and oranges. This sauce may be served with fillets of rainbow trout, among other foods.

See also

 List of dessert sauces
 List of sauces

References

Sauces
Dessert sauces